Brian Kurcaba (born October 25, 1976) is an American politician who served in the West Virginia House of Delegates from the 51st district from 2014 to 2016.

References

1976 births
Living people
Republican Party members of the West Virginia House of Delegates